Randall A. Ogden is a retired major general in the United States Air Force. He commanded the Fourth Air Force from March 2017 to April 2020.

Dates of promotion

References

Living people
Portland State University alumni
Recipients of the Defense Superior Service Medal
Recipients of the Legion of Merit
Troy University alumni
United States Air Force generals
United States Air Force personnel of the War in Afghanistan (2001–2021)
Year of birth missing (living people)